Homeobox protein Hox-B6 is a protein that in humans is encoded by the HOXB6 gene.

Function 

This gene is a member of the Antp homeobox family and encodes a protein with a homeobox DNA-binding domain. It is included in a cluster of homeobox B genes located on chromosome 17. The encoded protein functions as a sequence-specific transcription factor that is involved in development, including that of lung and skin, and has been localized to both the nucleus and cytoplasm. Altered expression of this gene or a change in the subcellular localization of its protein is associated with some cases of acute myeloid leukemia and colorectal cancer.

During development 

HOX B6 gene is only expressed in erythoid progenitor cells, which are the precursor to red blood cells used for transport of oxygen and carbon dioxide throughout the body. During development, the formation of the HOX gene factor happens in the first stages of fetal development, namely soon after the establishment of the mesoderm, which is the “middle layer” of the future embryo. However, HOX B6 is only expressed once the undifferentiated stem cells of the embryo distinguish themselves into the erythpoietic phase. The research has shown that HOX B6 is not expressed in hematopoietic stem cells located in the red bone marrow, which are the precursor cells to all types of blood cells, or primordial germ cells (PGCs), the precursor to cells passed on in each generation.  Since it is a transcriptional factor, HOX B6 regulates erythpoigenesis (red blood cell formation) using mRNA as the basis for certain protein productions.  The specific gene factor for erytopoigenesis has relatively been unobserved in the scientific community, and no known diseases have been associated with a defect HOX B6 gene. However, it has been shown in correlation with major skeletal deformations.

HOXB6 is a structural protein that has been shown to influence the growth and differentiation of the different blood lineages. This gene has also been shown to encourage the growth of granulocytes and monocytes, but at the cost of other blood cells. HOXB6 has the ability to cause the indefinite proliferation of murine marrow cells, as well as expand hematopoietic stem cells. When expressed abnormally, HOXB6 displays many characteristics of a potent oncoprotein. An oncoprotein can cause the transformation of a normal cell into a tumor cell. Overexpression of HOXB6, along with the addition of MEIS1 protein, has been implicated in the development of acute myeloid leukemia (AML). Acute myeloid leukemia is a cancer of the blood cells, specifically the leukocytes. The chromosomal irregularity most frequently seen in HOXB6 AML is a reappearing interstitial deletion of chromosome 2. Fundamental HOXB6 expression stops myeloid differentiation and debilitates erythropoiesis, megakaryopoiesis, and lymphopoiesis.

See also 
 Homeobox

References

Further reading

External links 
 
 

Transcription factors